Ciaran Ó Máille (14 June 1925 – 4 March 1977) was an Irish first-class cricketer and field hockey international.

Ó Máille was born at Dublin and was educated at Blackrock College. A mainstay of the Pembroke side for nearly twenty years, Ó Máille made two appearances in first-class cricket for Ireland, debuting in 1953 against Scotland at Belfast. A gap of seven years followed before his next first-class appearance against the Marylebone Cricket Club at Dublin in 1960. He scored 10 runs across three first-class innings. Ó Máille was also a hockey international for Ireland. He died aged 51 at Dublin in March 1977.

References

External links

1925 births
1977 deaths
Cricketers from County Dublin
People educated at Blackrock College
Irish cricketers
Irish male field hockey players
Ireland international men's field hockey players